Frank Sharry is the founder and executive director of America's Voice, a liberal immigration reform group.

Early life

He was raised in West Hartford, Connecticut, by an Italian-American mother and an Irish-American father. He graduated from Princeton University in 1978, majoring in history and American studies. He was captain of the soccer team his junior and senior year, served as a resident advisor his senior year and was active in student protest efforts regarding the role of private and selective eating clubs in college life and university investments in firms operating in a South Africa ruled by apartheid.

After graduation he taught secondary school for a year at the United World College of Southeast Asia in Singapore. He left to work for the American Council for Nationalities Service (ACNS) in Singapore and Indonesia to assist with the resettlement of boat refugees fleeing war-torn Vietnam in search of temporary safe haven in Indonesia.

He returned to the United States in 1980 and worked for ACNS in Fort Chaffee, Arkansas, helping to resettle Cuban refugees who arrived from the Cuban Port of Mariel. He then moved to the ACNS main office in New York to direct a special nationwide resettlement program for Cuban Refugees, and then was promoted to oversee the nationwide resettlement program in 27 cities for refugees from Southeast Asia, Africa and elsewhere.

Political advocacy

In 1986 Sharry left ACNS and moved to Cambridge, Massachusetts where he became the executive director of Centro Presente, a local organization that worked with Central Americans who had fled civil war and human rights violations in their countries of origin to seek safe haven in the greater Boston area.  While there he helped to found the Massachusetts Immigrant and Refugee Advocacy (MIRA) Coalition, a statewide immigrant advocacy organization.

In 1990 he was hired to become the executive director of the National Immigration Forum, one of the nation's premier immigration policy organizations based in Washington, D.C. It has been directly involved in every major legislative policy debate related to immigration since its founding in 1982. At the Forum he emerged as one of the leading pro-immigrant spokespeople, appearing frequently on television and radio, being quoted regularly in print publications, and addressing audiences throughout the country.

During his tenure at the Forum, he helped win relief for Central American and Haitian refugees, protected family reunification, and promoted a comprehensive overhaul of the nation's immigration system that would simultaneously reduce illegal immigration through smart enforcement, provide a path to legal status and citizenship to undocumented immigrants in the U.S., and reform the legal immigration system.

America's Voice

In 2008 he left the Forum to become the founder and executive director of America's Voice,. an organization that serves as the communications arm of the immigration reform movement.  Since its inception America's Voice has advocated for liberal immigration reform, including amnesty.

Sharry has also been featured in the documentary film series How Democracy Works Now by filmmakers Shari Robertson and Michael Camerini. The series features 12 films about the immigration debate in America
from 2000 through 2007. The last film in the series was aired on HBO in March 2010 under the title Senators' Bargain. It shows Sharry working with both Senator Edward Kennedy and the Bush White House for an immigration compromise that would have legalized most of the nation's 12 million undocumented immigrants, a compromise that was defeated on the floor of the U.S. Senate.

Film

Sharry is featured in the documentary film Last Best Chance , Story Twelve of the series  How Democracy Work Now, from filmmakers Shari Robertson and Michael Camerini. A cut of the film premiered on HBO in March 2010, under the title The Senator's Bargain .

He also appeared in The Game Is On , Story One in the series How Democracy Works Now. Frank is shown in Iowa giving a training seminar for media. Other films he appears in through the series include:
Story 2: Mountains and Clouds , where he and Cecilia Muñoz discuss being at a potential "watershed moment" for comprehensive immigration reform.
Story 7: Ain't the AFL for Nothin' , where he is shown helping with media for the Freedom Rides in 2003, and working behind the scenes with Hill staff.
Story 8: The Road to Miami , which includes a focus on Sharry's efforts to foster a comprehensive immigration reform bill with Sen. Ted Kennedy and Luis Gutiérrez as sponsors.
Story 9: Protecting Arizona , shows his activity fighting against the Protect Arizona Now ballot initiative. 
Story 11: The Senate Speaks , features Sharry in behind the scenes of Capitol Hill intrigue.

See also
 Immigration
 How Democracy Works Now: Twelve Stories

References

External links
 How Democracy Works Now: Twelve Stories - Series page

American lobbyists
Princeton University alumni
People from Hartford, Connecticut
Living people
American people of Irish descent
American people of Italian descent
Year of birth missing (living people)